Keysseria (island-daisy) is a genus of flowering plants in the family Asteraceae.

 Species
These are species accepted by the editors of the Global Compositae Checklist; several others are listed as being of uncertain affiliation.
 Keysseria erici (C.N.Forbes) Cabrera - Hawaii 
 Keysseria helenae  (C.N.Forbes & Lydgate) Cabrera - Hawaii
 Keysseria maviensis (H.Mann) Cabrera - Hawaii 
 Keysseria pickeringii (A.Gray) Cabrera - Fiji
 Keysseria pinguiculiformis J.Kost. - New Guinea

References

Asteraceae genera
Astereae
Flora of the Pacific